Teligati Union is an Union Parishad under Morrelganj Upazila of Bagerhat District in the division of Khulna, Bangladesh. It has an area of 51.98 km2 (20.07 sq mi) and a population of 13,871.

References

Unions of Morrelganj Upazila
Unions of Bagerhat District
Unions of Khulna Division